Samantha Susan Chang (born July 13, 2000) is a Canadian soccer player who plays as a midfielder for Portuguese club Torreense in the Campeonato Nacional de Futebol Feminino.

Early life
Chang was born in Mississauga, Ontario to a South Korean father and a Canadian mother and began playing soccer with the Mississauga Soccer Club at the age of 3, before eventually moving on to playing with Brams United of Brampton and then Unionville Milliken SC.

College career
In 2018, she signed a scholarship to play for the University of South Carolina's women's soccer team. She missed her freshman season in 2018, due to injury. She made her debut on August 22, 2019, recording two assists in a 2-1 victory over the NC State Wolfpack. She scored her first goal six days later against the Jacksonville Dolphins. She scored her first NCAA Tournament goal, which was also her first game-winning goal on November 16 against the Samford Bulldogs. In her debut season in 2019, she appeared in 23 games and was named to the SEC All-Freshman Team. After a gamewinning goal performance against the Arkansas Razorbacks in 2020, she earned SEC and National Player of the Week honours. She won the SEC title with South Carolina in her senior season, being named to the All-Tournament team.

Club career
In 2017, she began playing for Unionville Milliken's first team in League1 Ontario at age 16, serving as team captain, despite being on a roster with players as old as 25 with NCAA Division 1 experience. She was named the league's Young Player of the Year and a league First Team All-Star. She returned to UMSC in 2019, scoring once in six appearances. She returned to the side in 2022, scoring twice in her season debut against Simcoe County Rovers.

In February 2023, she joined Portuguese club Torreense in the Campeonato Nacional de Futebol Feminino. She scored her first goal in her debut on February 4, 2023 against Länk Vilaverdense.

International career
Chang has represented Canada at the 2014 CONCACAF Girls' U-15 Championship, scoring the winning penalty kick as Canada won the gold medal and was named to the tournament Best XI. She also represented Canada at the 2016 CONCACAF Women's U-17 Championship, 2016 FIFA U-17 Women's World Cup and 2020 CONCACAF Women's U-20 Championship.

She was named to the Canadian senior squad for the first time in 2021 for the 2021 SheBelieves Cup, making her debut on February 21 against Argentina.

References

2000 births
Living people
Canadian women's soccer players
Women's association football midfielders
Soccer players from Mississauga
South Carolina Gamecocks women's soccer players
Canada women's international soccer players
Canadian expatriate soccer players
Canadian expatriate sportspeople in the United States
Expatriate women's soccer players in the United States
Canadian people of South Korean descent
Canadian sportspeople of Korean descent
Unionville Milliken SC (women) players
League1 Ontario (women) players
Campeonato Nacional de Futebol Feminino players